Golden Cockerel may refer to:

Golden Cockerel Press, an English fine press operating between 1920 and 1961
The Golden Cockerel, an opera by Nikolai Rimsky-Korsakov
The Goldener Hahn, a ceremonial goblet in Münster, Germany